Take Your Time is the third studio album by Scatman John and the final released during his lifetime. It was released on June 1, 1999, six months before his death; although he suffered from lung cancer through most of the recording, he still managed to record and release the album.

The album had four singles released from it. Scatmambo which was used in the German film Love Scenes from Planet Earth. Japan got a double A side single, The Chickadee Song b/w Take Your Time. Take Your Time was issued in European countries, first with a 6 track release then a 4 track release with a memorial caption on the cover after his death. Ichi Ni San.... Go! was also released as a 3 track single in Europe, proving popular in Germany.

Album history 
His third album "Take Your Time", produced by Kai Matthiesen (producer of Mr. President, B-Charme, Crispy), was released on June 1, 1999. Scatman John died of lung cancer on 3 December 1999 at his home in California, six months after this album's release, ultimately making it his last. There were no music videos made for any of the tracks on this album, owing to John's deteriorating health. "Take Your Time" was released as a six-track CD-single. "Ichi Ni San...Go" was released as the follow up. In Japan, "The Chickadee Song" was released as a double-A-side single.
It featured the album version and remix of The Chickadee Song and the album version and 2 remix versions of "Take Your Time".
After John's death, the "Take Your Time" single was re-released. This time it had only 4 tracks and a banner on the cover which mentioned "In Loving Memory Of Scatman John".

Track listing

1999 albums
Scatman John albums
RCA Records albums